Armond Fields was an American market research consultant, a painter, a graphic artist, and a prolific social historian who wrote art and theater biographies.

Early life and education 
Armond Fields was born in Chicago, Illinois, to Louis Max and Esther Fields. His primary education he received in schools in the Mid-West. He received his B.S. from the University of Wisconsin (1953), M.A. from the University of Illinois (1955) and Ph.D. from the University of Chicago (1956).

Work 
Fields was active in several fields. As a writer he wrote several biographies, primarily on vaudeville performers. His oil paintings, drawings and prints were a part of exhibitions in the United States and Europe. He curated, wrote catalogues, and donated  art for various exhibitions (most recently: Paris, Turn-of-the-Century, Santa Barbara Museum of Art, 2003; Vaudeville is Dead! Long Live Vaudeville!, Doheny Library, University of Southern California, 2005). 
Fields also served as a consultant in the areas of market strategy and consumer behavior. Among his clients were Interpublic Co. (marketing and research vice president, 1960-69), for Audio-Video Entertainment, Inc. (corporate officer, 2000-?) and AltaVoice Communications (consumer behavior consultant, 2001?).

Bibliography 
 Henri Rivière (1983) 
 George Auriol (1985) 
 From the Bowery to Broadway: Lew Fields and the Roots of American Popular Theatre (1993) 
 Le Chat Noir: A Montmartre Cabaret and Its Artists in Turn-Of-The Century Paris (1994) 
 Eddie Foy: A Biography of the Early Popular Stage Comedian (1999) 

James J. Corbett: A Biography of the Heavyweight Boxing Champion and Popular Theater Headliner (2001) 
Fred Stone: Circus Performer and Musical Comedy Star (2002) 
Katharine Dexter McCormick: Pioneer for Women's Rights (2003) 
Sophie Tucker: First Lady of Show Business (2003) 
Maude Adams: Idol of American Theater, 1872-1953 (2004) 
Women Vaudeville Stars: Eighty Biographical Profiles (2006) 
Tony Pastor, Father of Vaudeville (2007) 
Lillian Russell: A Biography of "America's Beauty" (2008)

References

External links 
 Armond Fields Describes How WWI Hurt Vaudeville

1930 births
2008 deaths
20th-century American biographers